Songzhan is the town of Zhaodong, Suihua, Heilongjiang, China. It is located at the northwest of Zhaodong, away from Zhaodong city 30 km, and away from Harbin 90 km, away from Daqing 60 km. The area of Songzhan is 281 km². The town has eight administrate villages, 64 natural villages, and it has inhabitants 42,000. It has inhabitants 22,000 at the town city.

Name 
The name of Songzhan is meaning Song Railway Station. It is the shortest name of railway station in China, only the station with the one-character name. When the station built up, the command of construction team is with the last name of Song(), so called it Song station. After that, near the station it became a town, so it named Songzhan(lit. Song station).

History 
At Manchukuo, here existed the village. In 1945, it was the 7th Area of Zhaodong county. At spring of 1948, the 7th Area named Songzhan Area. In September 1951, it became Songzhan Town, under the 7th Area. In March 1956, the town be administrated directly by county. In September 1958, Xuanhua(), Ruiguang() were reconstructed with Songzhan and became Songzhan people's commune. In 1961, Xuanhua was restored. In March 1984, Songzhan restore the town.

Economy 
Songzhan is the commodity center of the north of Zhaodong, about four towns and five fields (Shangjia, Xuanhua, Anmin, Qinglong, Shiyan, Dongfeng, Sifangshan, Xianshe). It has a dairy industry that has been developed hundred years. The GDP of 2012 is 2.689 billion yuan, among this has 0.87 billion yuan comes from dairy industry.

Sub-divisions 
Songzhan has eight villages:
 Villages: Tiexi(), Xiaoguang(), Gongrong(), Leye(), Ruiguang(), Hesheng(), Wanfa(), Songzhan()

References 

Geography of Heilongjiang